The Planned Parenthood Association of Ghana (PPAG) is a volunteer-based non-governmental organization affiliated to International Planned Parenthood Federation, established in 1967. It provides Sexual and Reproductive Health (SRH) services in Ghana. PPAG has a team of 103 staff, over 1,000 volunteers, 300 peer educators, 551 community-based distributors (CBDs) and a youth wing call Youth Action Movement(YAM) with 810 membership of young people. PPAG also delivers services and programmes through 1,356 service points, including 11 permanent clinics, 54 mobile clinics and over 1,000 community-based service points (CBSs).

A comprehensive sexuality education manual for young people titled “KnowItOwnItLiveIt” has been launched with a call on parents to intensify sex education among their children to minimise sexually transmitted infections (STIs) and teenage pregnancy in the country.

Digital Contact Center 
PPAG has established a digital contact center named 'Yenkasa' which means ‘lets Talk’ in the Akan dialect. It is a platform for Sexual and Reproductive Health Rights (SRHR) information, counselling and referrals for young people in particular and the general public as a whole.  'Yenkasa Call center' focuses on meeting young people changing SRHR needs and challenges of young people, including Sexual and Gender Based Violence (SGBV), sexually transmitted Infections, unplanned pregnancy, mental health needs among others in four Ghanaian languages; Ga, Twi, Ewe, Dagbani and English.

Reference 

Medical and health organisations based in Ghana
International Planned Parenthood Federation affiliates